Atrans is the Roman name for Trojane, a town in Central Slovenia.  It was on the border between Italy and the province of Noricum.

Ancient Romans built a road spanning Aquileia, Emona, Atrans and Celeia. This was a very important road, military, post and market place, and the town was surrounded by a defensive wall.

The archaeological remains of Atrans can be still seen.

External links
Občina LUKOVICA — has a short paragraph describing archeological finds at Atrans.

Roman towns and cities in Slovenia